Orthrias brandti is a species of ray-finned fish in the family Balitoridae.
It is found in Georgia and Turkey.
Can be found also in Northern Greece, in the rivers Strymon and Nestos, so probably also in South Bulgaria.

References

Orthrias
Fish described in 1877
Taxonomy articles created by Polbot